Laheri Jeewan is a Bollywood film. It was released in 1941. It starred Husn Banu, Gope and W.M. Khan.

References

External links
 

1941 films
1940s Hindi-language films
Indian black-and-white films